Trichordestra prodeniformis is a species of cutworm or dart moth in the family Noctuidae. It is found in Central America and North America.

The MONA or Hodges number for Trichordestra prodeniformis is 10309.

References

Further reading

 
 
 

Hadenini
Articles created by Qbugbot
Moths described in 1888